Montezuma is an unincorporated community located in Rockingham County, in the U.S. state of Virginia.

Geography 
It is located northwest of Bridgewater.

References

Unincorporated communities in Rockingham County, Virginia
Unincorporated communities in Virginia